Benjamin George Frederick Green (born 28 September 1997) is an English cricketer who plays for Somerset County Cricket Club. He is a right-arm fast-medium pace bowler who also bats right-handed. He progressed through the Devon age group system before being offered a first team contract during the 2016 season. On 29 July 2016 he made his Twenty20 debut for Somerset against Hampshire in the 2016 NatWest t20 Blast.

On 3 August 2016, Green signed a three-year professional contract with Somerset.  He made his List A debut for Somerset in the 2018 Royal London One-Day Cup on 29 May 2018. He made his first-class debut for Somerset in the 2018 County Championship on 4 September 2018.

In June 2022, in the 2022 T20 Blast, Green took his first five-wicket haul in Twenty20 cricket, with 5/29 against Glamorgan.

Green struck 157 against Durham, in the Royal London Cup on 10 August 2022. His innings included 12 sixes and 10 fours. His maiden hundred in the competition came from 58 deliveries (of which the second fifty was hit from just 14 deliveries). His team still lost the game.

References

External links
 
 

1997 births
Living people
English cricketers
Somerset cricketers
Cricketers from Exeter
Devon cricketers